Lobelia oahuensis is a rare species of flowering plant in the bellflower family known by the common name Oahu lobelia. It is endemic to Hawaii, where it is known only from the island of Oahu. There are about 100 individuals remaining in the Koʻolau Range, and only one known individual in the Waianae Range. It is federally listed as an endangered species of the United States.

This plant grows almost exclusively on the high, exposed main ridge of the mountains, where its habitat is wet shrublands on the windy slopes up to the ridgelines of the cloud zone. It is threatened by habitat degradation and predation.

The inflorescence of this plant is over a meter long and densely packed with blue flowers.

References

External links
Carr's Hawaiian Lobelia
USDA Plants Profile

oahuensis
Endemic flora of Hawaii